Buntil is a traditional Indonesian-Javanese dish of grated coconut meat mixed with teri (anchovies) and spices, wrapped in papaya, cassava, or taro (or other similar aroids) leaves, then boiled in coconut milk and spices. It is a favourite dish in Java, and other than cooked homemade, it is also sold in warungs, restaurants or street side foodstalls, especially traditional temporary market during Ramadhan, prior of breaking the fast.

See also

Botok 
Pepes 
Krechek 
Gudeg
Sambal jengot (hot spicy sauce made from grated young coconut)
Serat Centhini, a cookbook written in 1824
Sarma (food)

References

Javanese cuisine
Foods containing coconut
Vegetable dishes of Indonesia
Anchovy dishes